Hemicentin 2 is a protein that in humans is encoded by the HMCN2 gene.

References

Further reading 

Extracellular matrix proteins